The Man Who Smiled (original: Mannen som log) is a novel by Swedish crime-writer Henning Mankell, and is the fourth in the Inspector Wallander series, although the English translations have not been published in chronological order.

Synopsis
After killing a man in the line of duty (in The White Lioness), Inspector Kurt Wallander finds himself spiralling into an alcohol-fuelled depression. He has just decided to leave the police when an old friend, Sten Torstensson, asks him to secretly investigate the recent death of his father in a car accident. At first Kurt dismisses his friend's suspicions as unlikely, but then Sten is found murdered in exactly the same manner as a Norwegian businessman shortly before. Against his previous judgement, Kurt returns to work to investigate what he is convinced is a case of double murder.

Adaptations
In 2003, The Man Who Smiled was adapted by Swedish public broadcaster Sveriges Television into a two-hour television movie, starring Rolf Lassgård as Wallander. The Man Who Smiled has also been adapted into a 90-minute television episode for the BBC's Wallander series starring Kenneth Branagh as Wallander. It was first broadcast on 10 January 2010.

1994 Swedish novels
Novels by Henning Mankell
Wallander
Ordfront books